Louisette Thobi (born 19 June 1967) is a Cameroonian sprinter. She competed in the women's 4 × 100 metres relay at the 1992 Summer Olympics.

References

1967 births
Living people
Athletes (track and field) at the 1992 Summer Olympics
Cameroonian female sprinters
Cameroonian female hurdlers
Olympic athletes of Cameroon
Place of birth missing (living people)
20th-century Cameroonian women